İnkaya is a village in Sarıkamış district of Kars Province, Turkey at . The former name of İnkaya was Micingert (Not to be confused with the other settlements with the same name  around) There are ruins of an Urartu (ca. 8th century BC) castle at the west and Saltuklu (1071-1202) castle at the east of the village.

References

Populated places in Kars Province
Towns in Turkey
Sarıkamış District